The racquetball competition at the World Games 2013 took place from July 26 to 28, 2013 at the Cañasgordas Club in Cali, Colombia.

Players qualified for this event from their performances at the 2012 Racquetball World Championships in Santo Domingo, Dominican Republic.

Medals table

Medals summary

References

2013 World Games
2013
2013 in racquetball
Racquetball in Colombia
Racquetball at multi-sport events